The Beachy Head-class repair ships were a class of 21 depot, maintenance and repair ships constructed for the Royal Navy during the Second World War. All of the ships in the class were constructed in Canada of which only five served in British waters during the war. Based on a modified mercantile design, five of the class were completed as merchant vessels after the war's end. Following the war, the majority were converted for mercantile use, with a further two ships ending up in service with the Royal Canadian Navy and another with the Royal Air Force.

Design and description
Following setbacks in the Pacific theatre of operations which led to the loss of naval bases, the Royal Navy required more depot and repair ships for the fleet to replace shore facilities. As part of the war construction programme, the Royal Navy ordered a series of vessels based on standard mercantile designs and modified them to fit their expected roles. Repair and maintenance vessels were ordered from Canadian shipyards with the escort maintenance ships intended to service smaller types of warships, such as frigates and corvettes. The Beachy Head class, ordered from a series of Canadian shipbuilders, was based on the Fort ship, but of the "Victory" type layout.

The vessels were propelled by one shaft driven by a reciprocating triple expansion steam engine powered by steam from two Foster Wheeler water-tube boilers, creating . Machinery was provided from three manufacturers; General Machinery Corporation of Hamilton, Ohio, Canadian Allis-Chalmers Ltd and Dominion Engineering Works of Montreal, Quebec. The vessels had a complement of 270. During the war, the vessels were armed with sixteen single-mounted 20 mm Oerlikon cannons.

Ships in class

Service history
Of the sixteen vessels that completed before the end of the war, Fife Ness, Girdle Ness, Dodman Point, Dungeness and Spurn Point served in British waters around the United Kingdom. The remaining eleven vessels served either in the East Indies or in the Pacific. Following the war, Beachy Head was loaned to the Royal Netherlands Navy and renamed Vulkaan. The vessel returned to Royal Navy service in 1949 and was then sold to the Royal Canadian Navy and renamed Cape Scott in 1954. Flamborough Head was also sold to the Royal Canadian Navy and renamed Cape Breton in 1954. Fife Ness was transferred to the Royal Air Force and renamed Adastral in 1947.

The stern of Cape Breton was scrapped at the North Vancouver, British Columbia waterfront in 2014 despite protests, the rest of the ship having been sunk as an artificial reef.

See also

References

Citations

Sources

External links
 Beachy Head class at uboat.net

Auxiliary ships of the Royal Navy
Ships of the Royal Air Force